George Charles Sim (1847 – 17 May 1922) was a journalist, and member of the Queensland Legislative Assembly.

Early days
Sim was born in Bradford, Yorkshire, to parents David Sim and his wife Margaret (née Anderson). After receiving his education in Bradford, he arrived in Australia where he became a prospector and mining expert in 1870. He then became a journalist for the Carpentaria Times before moving to Brisbane to continue his career in journalism.

Political career
Sim, after unsuccessfully contesting the seat of Burke in 1890, won the seat of Carpentaria in the Queensland Legislative Assembly in 1896. He held the seat for three years before being defeated in 1899.

Personal life
Sim died at Wynnum in 1922 and was buried in the Toowong Cemetery.

References

1847 births
1922 deaths
Members of the Queensland Legislative Assembly
Burials at Toowong Cemetery
Australian Labor Party members of the Parliament of Queensland